Socket 2 was one of the series of CPU sockets into which various x86 microprocessors were inserted. It was an updated Socket 1 with added support for Pentium OverDrive processors.

Socket 2 was a 238-pin low insertion force (LIF) or zero insertion force (ZIF) 19×19 pin grid array (PGA) socket suitable for the 5-volt, 25 to 66 MHz 486 SX, 486 DX, 486 DX2, 486 OverDrive and 63 or 83 MHz Pentium OverDrive processors.

See also
 List of Intel microprocessors

References
 

Socket 002